Stenidea insignis is a species of beetle in the family Cerambycidae. It was described by William Lucas Distant in 1898. It is known from Botswana, Burundi, Rwanda, the Ivory Coast, Tanzania, Angola, Kenya, Sierra Leone, Ethiopia, Sudan, Uganda, South Africa, Zambia, and Zimbabwe.

References

insignis
Beetles described in 1898